Seven Oaks Estate, the former Charles F. Park estate, is a historic estate located at Palisades in Rockland County, New York designed by George E. Woodward, an editor of the Horticulturist magazine. The main estate house is a large clapboarded structure built in 1862 in the Gothic Revival style, with cues from Calvert Vaux's Villas and Cottages (1857). The house features a projecting central bay and full-width verandah. Also on the property are a coachman's house, built about 1862, and four subsidiary outbuildings.

It was listed on the National Register of Historic Places in 1990.

References

Houses on the National Register of Historic Places in New York (state)
Gothic Revival architecture in New York (state)
Houses completed in 1862
Houses in Rockland County, New York
1862 establishments in New York (state)
National Register of Historic Places in Rockland County, New York